Proview International Holdings Ltd is a Hong Kong-based manufacturer of computer monitors and other media devices. The company markets its products under its own and other brand name through its extensive distribution network over the world. Proview manufactures CRT and LCD monitors, LCD TVs, Plasma TVs and DVD players. Proview has production facilities located in Shenzhen and Wuhan in China, and in Brazil and Taiwan.

Proview holds the "iPad" trademark for China and has sued Apple for US$1.6 billion in damages. Apple has countered that the suit is a shakedown to prop up the company due to its significant debt and impending collapse. Apple ended the dispute paying $60 million to Proview.

Proview had been delisted from the stock market and the surviving group have not been able to return to business as of January 2019. Their web site is also gone.

References

External links
 

Companies listed on the Hong Kong Stock Exchange
Computer hardware companies
Hong Kong brands